Occupational acne is caused by several different groups of industrial compounds, including coal tar derivatives, insoluble cutting oils, and chlorinated hydrocarbons (chlornaphthalenes, chlordiphenyls, and chlordiphenyloxides).

See also
 List of cutaneous conditions

References

External links 

Acneiform eruptions